Confederate Memorial Day (called Confederate Heroes Day in Texas and Florida, and Confederate Decoration Day in Tennessee) is a cultural holiday observed in several Southern U.S. states on various dates since the end of the American Civil War.

The holiday was originally and is still publicly presented as a day to remember the estimated 258,000 Confederate soldiers who died during the American Civil War. Writers and historians have pointed out that the holiday's official recognition by states often coincided with the height of Jim Crow racism around the United States, decades after the war ended. Renewed interest also revived the holiday in some places during the beginning of the civil rights movement in the 1950's. The Southern Poverty Law Center has condemned the holiday as part of a campaign of "racial terror" on the part of white supremacists - "an organized propaganda campaign, created to instill fear and ensure the ongoing oppression of formerly enslaved people."

The holiday originated at a local level by Ladies' Memorial Associations to care for the graves of Confederate dead. It is currently an official state holiday in Alabama, Mississippi, and South Carolina; while it is commemorated in Kentucky, Florida, North Carolina, Texas, and Tennessee. It was also formerly recognized in Missouri, Arkansas, Georgia, Louisiana, and Virginia. Several states celebrate it on or near April 26, when the last major Confederate field army surrendered at Bennett Place, North Carolina in 1865.  

In 1866, General John A. Logan commanded the posts of Grand Army of the Republic to strew flowers on the graves of Union soldiers, which observance later became the national Memorial Day. In a speech to veterans in Salem, Illinois, on July 4, 1866, Logan referred to the various dates of observance adopted in the South for the practice saying  "…traitors in the South have their gatherings day after day, to strew garlands of flowers upon the graves of Rebel soldiers..."

Origins

In the spring of 1866 the Ladies Memorial Association of Columbus, Georgia, passed a resolution to set aside one day annually to memorialize the Confederate war dead. Mary Ann Williams, the association secretary, was directed to pen a letter inviting ladies associations in every former Confederate state to join them in the observance. Their invitation was written in March 1866 and sent to all of the principal cities in the former Confederacy, including Atlanta; Macon; Montgomery; Memphis; Richmond; St. Louis; Alexandria; Columbia; and New Orleans, as well as smaller towns like Staunton, Virginia; Anderson, South Carolina; and Wilmington, North Carolina. The actual date for the holiday was selected by Elizabeth Rutherford Ellis. She chose April 26, the first anniversary of Confederate General Johnston's surrender to Union Major General Sherman at Bennett Place. For many in the Confederacy, that date in 1865 marked the end of the Civil War.

The first official celebration as a public holiday occurred in 1874, following a proclamation by the Georgia legislature. By 1916, ten states celebrated it, on June 3, the birthday of CSA President Jefferson Davis. Other states chose late April dates, or May 10, commemorating Davis' capture.

Various writers and historians have pointed out that the holiday's official recognition by states often coincided with the height of Jim Crow racism around the United States, decades after the war ended. In some places, the holiday attracted revived interest as a reaction to the early civil rights movement in the 1950's. The SPLC has condemned the observance of Confederate Memorial Day as a symbol "used by white supremacists" as a tool of "racial terror".

Connection to Memorial Day
In their book, The Genesis of the Memorial Day Holiday in America, Bellware and Gardiner assert that the national Memorial Day holiday is a direct offshoot of the observance begun by the Ladies Memorial Association of Columbus, Georgia in 1866. In a few places, most notably Columbus, Mississippi and Macon, Georgia, both Confederate and Union graves were decorated during the first observance. The day was even referred to as Memorial Day by The Baltimore Sun on May 8, 1866, after the ladies organization that started it. The name Confederate Memorial Day was not used until the Northern observance was initiated in 1868.

While initially cool to the idea of a Northern version of the holiday, General John A. Logan was eventually won over. His General Order No. 11, issued May 5, 1868, commanded the posts of Grand Army of the Republic to strew flowers on the graves of Union soldiers. The Grand Army of the Republic eventually adopted the name Memorial Day at their national encampment in 1882.

Many theories have been offered as to how Logan became aware of the former Confederate tradition he imitated in 1868. In her autobiography, his wife claims she told him about it after a trip to Virginia in the spring of that year. His secretary and his adjutant also claim they told him about it. John Murray of Waterloo, New York, claims it was he who inspired Logan in 1868. Bellware and Gardiner, however, offer proof that Logan was aware of the Southern tributes long before any of them had a chance to mention it to him. In a speech to veterans in Salem, Illinois, on July 4, 1866, Logan referred to the various dates of observance adopted in the South for the practice saying  "…traitors in the South have their gatherings day after day, to strew garlands of flowers upon the graves of Rebel soldiers..."

Statutory holidays
Confederate Memorial Day is a statutory holiday in Alabama on the fourth Monday in April, in Mississippi on the final Monday in April, and in South Carolina on May 10. In all of these states, state offices are closed on this day.

In Georgia, the fourth Monday in April was formerly celebrated as Confederate Memorial Day, but beginning in 2016, in response to the Charleston church shooting, the names of Confederate Memorial Day and Robert E. Lee's Birthday were struck from the state calendar and the statutory holidays were designated simply as "state holidays". Florida also continues to officially designate Confederate Memorial Day on the fourth Monday in April, although state offices remain open.

North Carolina also designates the holiday on May 10, although state offices remain open and localities may choose whether to observe it. 

In June 2022, the Louisiana State Legislature voted to remove Confederate Memorial Day, as well as Robert E. Lee Day, from the state's calendar of official holidays.

Related holidays

Tennessee
In Tennessee, the governor is required by law to proclaim Confederate Decoration Day each June 3.

Texas
In Texas, Robert E. Lee's birthday (January 19th) was made a state holiday in 1931. In 1973, "Lee Day" was renamed "Confederate Heroes Day", consolidating it with a holiday celebrating Jefferson Davis and putting it the day after Martin Luther King Day. The official state description of the holiday states it is held "in honor of Jefferson Davis, Robert E. Lee, and other Confederate heroes;". State offices remain open but employees may have an optional day off.

Controversy

The holiday has been condemned by the Southern Poverty Law Center as part of a campaign of "racial terror" on the part of white supremacists, "an organized propaganda campaign, created to instill fear and ensure the ongoing oppression of formerly enslaved people". Critics often cite the fact that the Confederacy was formed for the purpose of protecting slavery. Some commemorations have been met with groups of protesters.

Various proposals have been made in the legislatures of the states still recognizing it to remove it from the list of state holidays or commemorations, or to replace it with Juneteenth.

The campaign for de-recognition of the holiday overlaps with that for removal of Confederate monuments and memorials, and is often highlighted after incidents of racial violence, such as the Charleston church shooting, the 2017 Charlottesville car attack, and the 2020 murder of George Floyd.

See also
 Commemoration of the American Civil War
 List of Confederate monuments and memorials
 Lost Cause of the Confederacy

References

Further reading

 
 Bellware, Daniel, and Richard Gardiner, PhD. The Genesis of the Memorial Day Holiday in America. Columbus, GA: Columbus State U, 2014. Print.

External links
 Confederate Memorial Day at NCpedia (ncpedia.org)
 

1866 establishments in Georgia (U.S. state)
Alabama state holidays
Annual events in the United States
April 1866 events
April observances 
Holidays related to the American Civil War
January observances
June observances
May observances
Mississippi state holidays
Observances in the United States
October observances
Recurring events established in 1866
Texas state holidays